Rivière du Grand Carbet is a river of Guadeloupe. It flows through Guadeloupe National Park and into the Caribbean Sea near Capesterre-Belle-Eau. A bridge was built over it in 1788–9.

References

Rivers of Guadeloupe
Rivers of France